The Church of Saint Nicholas is a Greek Orthodox church located in the Splanzia square in the town of Chania, Crete, Greece. It is dedicated to Saint Nicholas. Originally a Catholic church, it was converted into a mosque during the Ottoman period and then back into a church in the twentieth century. It is the only building in Greece to possess both a bell tower and a minaret.

History 
The church was built around 1320 by the Dominican brotherhood of Candia as a Catholic cathedral. When Crete fell to the Ottoman Turks in the seventeenth century, the church was converted into a mosque known as the Hünkar Mosque (“sovereign’s mosque”). Accordingly, Splanzia became the Muslim quarter of the town.

In the mosque was kept the sacred sword of the Turkish Dervish, who first entered the city, climbed the bell tower and with the sword circled the four points of the horizon calling the faithful to prayer with the phrase: "There is only one God and his prophet is Muhammad".

Throughout the period of the Turkish rule and up to 1912 when Crete was annexed by the Kingdom of Greece, the Dervish sword remained in the Saint Nicholas until the exchange of Muslim and Christian populations between Turkey and Greece in 1923, when the Muslim population that had to depart Crete and took it with them.

In 1918 the mosque was converted back into a Christian church, Orthodox this time.

Structure 
Architecturally, the Monastery of Saint Nicholas of the Dominicans is a basilica.

The original bell tower of Saint Nicholas was located in the northeast of the church, but it does not survive and had to be rebuilt. To the west of the church is the atrium of the enclosed courtyard of the church, which served as a cemetery for nobles during both the Venetian and Turkish periods.

For the conversion of the Catholic church into an Islamic mosque in the year 1645, the necessary additions of the mihrab, the minbar and the minaret were made. It was the most important mosque of Chania and its minaret stood out due to its two balconies.

The minaret of Hünkar Mosque was built in contact with the southern side of the building and facing its western end; the western side of the minaret was built in contact with a pre-existing two-storey building of the monastery which was demolished some time later. The minaret is cylindrical and is of the classical Ottoman style. The current height of the minaret reaches about 36 metres in height, while together with the conical roof (which is no longer preserved) it should have exceeded forty metres.

Gallery

See also 
 Catholic Church in Greece
 List of former mosques in Greece

References

Bibliography

Further reading 
 Ανδριανάκης, Μιχάλης Γ., Γιαπιτσόγλου, Κωνσταντίνος, Χριστιανικά Μνημεία της Κρήτης, Συνοδική Επιτροπή Θρησκευτικού Τουρισμού της Εκκλησίας Κρήτης: Μ.Κ.Ο. "Φιλοξενία", Ηράκλειο 2012.
 Ψιλάκης, Βασίλειος, Ιστορία της Κρήτης: από της απωτάτης αρχαιότητος μέχρι των καθ' ημάς χρόνων, τ. Γ΄, εκδ. Νέα Έρευνα, εν Χανίοις, 1909.

External links 
 

Saint Nicholas
Saint Nicholas
Buildings and structures in Chania
Churches in Crete
Churches completed in 1320
14th-century churches in Greece
Roman Catholic churches in Greece
Eastern Orthodoxy in Crete
Ottoman architecture in Crete
Basilica churches in Greece
14th-century establishments in the Republic of Venice